9th SFFCC Awards
December 13, 2010

Best Picture: 
 The Social Network 

The 9th San Francisco Film Critics Circle Awards, honoring the best in film for 2010, were given on 13 December 2010.

Winners

Best Picture:
The Social Network
Best Director (TIE):
Darren Aronofsky – Black Swan
David Fincher – The Social Network
Best Original Screenplay:
The King's Speech – David Seidler
Best Adapted Screenplay:
The Social Network – Aaron Sorkin
Best Actor:
Colin Firth – The King's Speech
Best Actress:
Michelle Williams – Blue Valentine
Best Supporting Actor:
John Hawkes – Winter's Bone
Best Supporting Actress:
Jacki Weaver – Animal Kingdom
Best Animated Feature:
Toy Story 3
Best Foreign Language Film:
Mother (Madeo) • South Korea
Best Documentary:
The Tillman Story
Best Cinematography:
Black Swan – Matthew Libatique
Marlon Riggs Award (for courage & vision in the Bay Area film community):
Elliot Lavine (in recognition of his two decades of film programming, his revival of rare archival and independent titles, and his role in the renewed popularity of film noir and pre-Production Code features)

References
 S.F. Film Critics Circle honors 'Social Network'

External links
 2010 San Francisco Film Critics Circle Awards

San Francisco Film Critics Circle Awards
2010 film awards